The 1999–2000 season was the 73rd season in the existence of U.S. Lecce and the club's first season back in the top flight of Italian football. In addition to the domestic league, Lecce participated in this season's edition of the Coppa Italia.

Players

Transfers

In

Out

Pre-season and friendlies

Competitions

Overall record

Serie A

League table

Results summary

Results by round

Matches

Coppa Italia

References 

U.S. Lecce seasons
Lecce